Saruda Konfay (born 9 January 1999) is a Thai footballer who plays as a defender for Chonburi WFC and the Thailand women's national team.

References

1999 births
Living people
Women's association football defenders
Saruda Konfay
Saruda Konfay
Saruda Konfay